There have been three United States Navy ships that have borne the name Talbot
  was a torpedo boat commissioned in 1898 and was named after US Navy lieutenant John Gunnell Talbot.
  was a  commissioned in 1967, named after Captain Silas Talbot.

Similar named
 , a Wickes-class destroyer, was named for Joshua Frederick Cockey Talbott.

United States Navy ship names